"The Wheels on the Bus" is an American folk song written by Verna Hills (1898–1990). The earliest known publishing of the lyrics is the December 1937 issue of American Childhood, originally called "The Bus", with the lyrics being "The wheels of the bus", with each verse ending in lines relevant to what the verse spoke of, as opposed to the current standard "all through the town" (or "all day long" in some versions).

It is a popular children's song in the United Kingdom, the United States, Australia, Canada, Sweden, Italy, Denmark, and the Netherlands. It has a repetitive rhythm, making the song easy for many people to sing, in a manner similar to the song "99 Bottles of Beer". It is based on the traditional British song "Here We Go Round the Mulberry Bush". The song is also sometimes sung to the tune of "Buffalo Gals", as in the version done by Raffi.

1. The wheels on the bus go round and round
Round and round
Round and round
The wheels on the bus go round and round
All through the town

2. The wipers on the bus go, "Swish, swish, swish"
"Swish, swish, swish"
"Swish, swish, swish"
The wipers on the bus go, "Swish, swish, swish"
All through the town

3. The driver on the bus goes, "Move on back"
"Move on back"
"Move on back"
The driver on the bus goes, "Move on back"
All through the town

4. The people on the bus go up and down
Up and down
Up and down
The people on the bus go up and down
All through the town

5. The horn on the bus goes, "Beep, beep, beep"
"Beep, beep, beep"
"Beep, beep, beep"
The horn on the bus goes, "Beep, beep, beep"
All through the town

6. The baby on the bus goes, "Wah, Wah, Wah"
"Wah, wah, wah"
"Wah, Wah, Wah"
The baby on the bus goes, "Wah, 
Wah, Wah"
All through the town

7. The mommies on the bus go, "Shh, shh, shh"
"Shh, shh, shh"
"Shh, shh, shh"
The daddies on the bus go, "Shh, shh, shh"
All through the town

Normally followed by "The wipers on the bus go swish swish swish" (with action), "the horn on the bus goes beep beep beep", and "the people on the bus go up and down" (with action). Some versions substitute "bounce up and down" for "go up and down", and some modern commercial recordings of the song in children's toys simplify the tune by copying notes 7 through 9 onto notes 13 through 15.

Lyrics as they were originally found in the December 1937 issue of American Childhood:1. The wheels of the bus go round and round,
Round and round, round and round;
The wheels of the bus go round and round,
Over the city streets.

2. The horn of the bus goes "Too-to-too,
"Too-to-too, too-to-too,"
the horn of the bus goes "Too-to-too"
At the other busses it meets.

3. The people in the bus go up and down,
Up and down,
up and down;
The people in the bus go up and down,
Bouncing off their seats.Note that this version does not make any reference to the melody that is commonly attached to the song.

Other recordings 

In 2002, American Madonna impersonator Michelle Chappel, under the stage name "Mad Donna", released a single which sampled the nursery rhyme, featuring a version of Madonna's 1998 song "Ray of Light" over which the classic children's song was sung. The single reached No. 17 in the United Kingdom and also made the charts elsewhere in Europe.

The song also has lyrics in Swedish, Hjulen på bussen ("The Wheels on the Bus"), and among the artists who have recorded it are Pernilla Wahlgren in 1996.

References

American folk songs
American children's songs
Traditional children's songs
2002 singles
Songs about buses
1937 songs